Sturt Highway is an Australian national highway in New South Wales, Victoria, and South Australia. It is an important road link for the transport of passengers and freight between Sydney and Adelaide and the regions situated adjacent to the route.

Initially an amalgam of trunk routes, the  Sturt Highway was proclaimed a state highway in 1933. In 1955, the Australian Government gazetted the highway as a National Route, and upgraded it as a National Highway in 1992, forming the Sydney-Adelaide Link. Sturt Highway is allocated route A20 for its entire length, the majority of which is a single carriageway, and freeway standard and 6-lane arterial road standard towards its western terminus in Gawler.

Route
The highway runs generally east-west, roughly aligned to the southern bank of the Murrumbidgee River in New South Wales, then, following that river's confluence with the Murray River, aligned to the Murray in north-western Victoria and eastern South Australia, generally towards the northern outskirts of Adelaide. The highway is the shortest, highest-standard route between Sydney and Adelaide.

The eastern terminus of Sturt Highway is at a junction with Hume Highway at Tarcutta, near Gundagai. Heading west, the highway passes through the city of Wagga Wagga and the towns Narrandera, Darlington Point, Hay, Balranald, Euston, leaving NSW by crossing the Murray River into Victoria from Buronga to Mildura. The highway continues more or less due west through the northwest of Victoria before entering South Australia. In South Australia, Sturt Highway passes Renmark, Monash, Barmera, Waikerie, Blanchetown and Nuriootpa, where it reaches its western terminus at the interchange with Gawler Bypass and Northern Expressway on the outskirts of Gawler.

History
The route now known as Sturt Highway originated from stock routes cut across southern New South Wales through the 19th century: overlanders would travel from Sydney's Main South Road (now Hume Highway) to Albury, and follow along the southern bank of the Murray River to Adelaide. Edward John Eyre, the English explorer, travelled from Limestone Plains (now Canberra) to Adelaide via this route in 1837, as did Charles Sturt in 1838, before Eyre on his second run to South Australia headed west following the northern bank of the Murrumbidgee River instead, crossing it at its junction with the Murray close to Boundary Bend, and proceeded to Adelaide from there. The road pioneered by Eyre in 1839 left the Hume Highway at Gundagai and followed the northern bank of the Murrumbidgee through the sites of Wagga Wagga, Narrandera, Hay and Balranald, and the north bank of the Murray River through the sites of Euston and Wentworth, passing north of Lake Victoria to the border with South Australia and onwards to Renmark; by 1852 a mail service by horseback operated from Wagga Wagga as far west as Balranald.

The route used by coaches between Wagga Wagga and the South Australian border as late as 1914 ran along the northern bank of the Murrumbidgee to Darlington Point - a bridge was built across the river in 1905, replacing a punt service operating from 1886 - and then along the river's southern bank to Hay, crossing the river again (a bridge in Hay had opened in 1874 by Sir Henry Parkes, replacing a ferry service operating since the 1850s). The route then travelled the northern side of the Murrumbidgee again through Maude and Balranald and onwards to Adelaide; by 1919 the route from Hay had been altered to travel the river's southern bank to Maude, before departing the water course for a more-direct route to Balranald (crossing the river there by a bridge opened in 1876).. By 1928, the route had shifted south of the Murrumbidgee River between Tarcutta and Narrandera.

The passing of the Main Roads Act of 1924 through the Parliament of New South Wales provided for the declaration of Main Roads, roads partially funded by the State government through the Main Roads Board (later the Department of Main Roads, and eventually Transport for NSW). Main Road No. 4 was declared along this road from the intersection with Hume Highway from Lower Tarcutta to Wagga Wagga (and continuing eastwards via Tumut, Adaminaby, Cooma, and Bega to Tathra) as part of Monaro Highway, Main Road No. 6 was declared from Balranald via Euston and Wentworth to the state border with South Australia (and continuing eastwards via Oxley, Booligal, Gunbar, Rankins Springs, Wyalong and Cowra to Bathurst) as part of Mid-Western Highway, and Main Road No. 58 was declared from Hay via Narranderra to Wagga Wagga (and continuing westwards via Maude to Oxley), on the same day, 8 August 1928. With the passing of the Main Roads (Amendment) Act of 1929 to provide for additional declarations of State Highways and Trunk Roads, these were amended to State Highways 4 and 6 and Trunk Road 58 on 8 April 1929.

Mid-Western Highway was rerouted between Gunbar and Balranald to pass through Hay, and the western end of Trunk Road 58 was truncated to meet it at Hay, on 24 September 1929. The route of the main road from Narrandera to Darlington Point had shifted to the southern side of the river at this stage, thus following the present route east from Balranald. On 16 September 1930, the road between Wagga Wagga and Hay (Trunk Road 58) was named Sturt Trunk Road, in honour of Captain Charles Sturt who explored the area a century earlier and opened it up for agriculture. 

The Department of Main Roads, which had succeeded the MRB in the previous year, declared Sturt Highway as State Highway 14 on 8 August 1933, from the intersection with Hume Highway at Lower Tarcutta via Wagga Wagga, Hay, Balranald, Euston and Wentworth to the state border with South Australia, subsuming the existing portions of Monaro Highway (State Highway 4) between Wagga Wagga and Lower Tarcutta, Sturt Trunk Road (Trunk Road 58) from Wagga Wagga to Hay, and Mid-Western Highway (State Highway 6) from Hay to the state border with South Australia. eventually to Adelaide via Renmark; the western end of Monaro Highway (today Snowy Mountains Highway) was truncated to meet Hume Highway in Tarcutta, and the western end of Mid-Western Highway was truncated to meet Sturt Highway in Hay, as a result. On 1 July 1938, the South Australian government decreed "the road from Gawler through Blanchetown to the border beyond Renmark will be known as the Sturt Highway", to join with the same road in New South Wales.

In 1939, Sturt Highway was rerouted to run via Mildura, using the former alignment of the Murray Valley Highway (constructed in 1927 to provide a shorter, all-weather road connection between Mildura and Renmark, already declared a State Highway by the Country Roads Board of Victoria in September 1932) to make it the most direct route to Adelaide.

Sturt Highway was signed National Route 20 across its entire length in 1955. The Whitlam Government introduced the federal National Roads Act 1974, where roads declared as a National Highway were still the responsibility of the states for road construction and maintenance, but were fully compensated by the Federal government for money spent on approved projects. As an important interstate link between the capitals of New South Wales and South Australia, Sturt Highway was declared a National Highway in 1992. With all three states' conversion to their newer alphanumeric systems between the late 1990s to the early 2010s, its former route number was updated to A20 for the highway within Victoria (in 1997), South Australia (in 1998), and eventually the New South Wales section (in 2013).

The passing of the Roads Act of 1993 through the Parliament of New South Wales updated road classifications and the way they could be declared within New South Wales. Under this act, Sturt Highway today retains its declaration as Highway 14, from the intersection with Hume Highway north of Tarcutta to the bridge over the Murray River at Mildura.

The passing of the Road Management Act 2004 through the Parliament of Victoria granted the responsibility of overall management and development of Victoria's major arterial roads to VicRoads: in 2004, VicRoads re-declared Sturt Highway (Arterial #6610) from the border with South Australia at Murray-Sunset to the border with New South Wales in Mildura.

Upgrades

South Australia
None of the Sturt Highway was originally constructed as dual-carriageway, however work commenced in January 2007 to upgrade the highway to two lanes each way dual carriageway between the Gawler Bypass and Greenock in the Barossa Valley. The project was completed in 2010 with budget savings directed towards further Sturt Highway improvements.

Northern Expressway was built at the south-western end of the Sturt Highway, as part of an AusLink/Government of South Australia project to build a new freeway-standard road as part of the North–South Corridor project, providing better access for road transport to Port Adelaide and the industrial areas west and northwest of the city.

Other projects in South Australia include a number of overtaking lanes added in the 2000s and 2010s to help make it safer with the high volume of traffic. Major 'S'-bend curves near Waikerie were realigned, and further upgrades to the road were performed up to 2012.

Significant route changes
The original route of the Sturt Highway in the Riverland passing through Berri and Glossop was bypassed to pass through Monash in 1995; the former alignment is now known as the Old Sturt Highway, route B201. The original route also passed through the middle of the Barossa Valley along what is now the Barossa Valley Way. This first changed to a route passing to the north of Nuriootpa around to the north and west of Gawler on the Gawler Bypass and Main North Road to Gepps Cross. It later changed to use the Northern Expressway instead. The more recent road duplication led to it bypassing Daveyston and Shea-Oak Log instead of passing through these small towns.

When the Northern Expressway and Northern Connector were assigned as route M2, route A20 reverted to following Main North Road south to Gepps Cross.

Truro bypass
A new alignment is proposed to be built to the north of the town of Truro to remove the highway traffic from the main street of the town. The bypass is proposed to be funded by the Australian government for $161.6 million and state government $40.4 million. Construction is expected to start late in 2022 and be completed by the end of 2026. The project will also adjust the alignment to reduce the steep hill between the Murray Flats and Truro. It will be built to a standard suitable for triple road trains.

Victoria
There is also the proposed Mildura Truck Bypass, to be funded by Auslink 2.

Major river crossings
From east to west, the Sturt Highway follows much of the course of the Murrumbidgee River, on its southern banks, from the Sturt's eastern terminus with the Hume Motorway. At  the Sturt Highway crosses the Murrumbidgee, carrying the highway to the north of the river via the Balranald Bridge.

The bridge at Blanchetown was originally opened in 1964. It replaced cable ferries, and was itself replaced in 1998 in response to concern about its ability to continue to carry B-double trucks. The bridge at Kingston On Murray was opened in 1973 also replacing a very busy ferry crossing.

Major intersections

Towns on Sturt Highway

South Australia
 
 
 
 
 
 
 
 
 
 

Victoria
 
 
 

New South Wales

Gallery

See also

 Highways in Australia
 List of highways in New South Wales
 List of highways in South Australia
 List of highways in Victoria

References

External links

Highways in Australia
Riverina
Highways in New South Wales
Highways in South Australia
Highways in Victoria (Australia)
Charles Sturt